Zephyranthes robusta, synonym Habranthus robustus, commonly known as the Brazilian copperlily, pink fairy lily or the pink rain lily, is a species of herbaceous flowering bulb. It is native to Brazil, Argentina and Uruguay, but is now naturalized in Florida, Colombia, South Africa, and Mauritius.

Description
Zephyranthes robusta is a relatively large species of rain lily.

Taxonomy and nomenclature

Zephyranthes robusta belongs to the genus Zephyranthes (rain lilies)  of the tribe Hippeastreae, within the subfamily Amaryllidoideae of the amaryllis family (Amaryllidaceae). In older classifications, it was sometimes included within the lily family (Liliaceae). Once treated as Habranthus robustus, it is now re-included in Zephyranthes.

It is commonly known as the 'pink fairy lily', 'pink rain lily', 'pink zephyr lily', 'pink magic lily', 'pink fawn lily', and 'Colombiaanse mini-amaryllis'. It is known as cebollita in Spanish.

Due to having the same common names, it is also frequently confused with other 'pink rain lilies' - namely Zephyranthes rosea and Zephyranthes carinata (also sold under the name Zephyranthes grandiflora). The three species are often mislabeled, but Z. robusta is easily recognizable from the other two by its larger, more strongly bent (and often asymmetrical), paler pink flowers. Z. robusta also has leaves covered with a fine grayish waxy coating (glaucous) in contrast to the leaves of Z. carinata.

Distribution and habitat
Zephyranthes robusta is believed to have originated from Rio Grande do Sul of Brazil. It is native to Brazil, Argentina, and Uruguay, and is widely naturalized elsewhere.

Cultivation and uses
Zephyranthes robusta is widely grown as an ornamental. It is one of the most prolific of the summer flowering rain lilies. They are propagated by dividing the bulbs (including offsets) and from seed. They are not as tolerant of colder temperatures as other rain lilies.

Chemical composition

The plant contains some toxic compounds like lycorine. Other compound include galanthamine, 3-epimacronine, hippeastidine, lycoramine, galanthine, haemanthamine, haemanthidine, hamayne, tazettine, vittatine, 11-hydroxy vittatine, 8-O-demethylmaritidine.

Toxicity
Similar to the closely related species of Zephyranthes, Z. robusta contains toxic alkaloids. Mainly galantamine-type alkaloids which can be lethal for humans.

References

External links 

robusta
Flora of Brazil
Flora of Argentina
Flora of Uruguay
Garden plants of South America
Plants described in 1829
Garden plants